"Electric Light" is a song by Danish pop duo Infernal. It was released as the third single from the album Electric Cabaret, on 28 December 2008. "Electric Light" was the third most played song on Danish radio stations in 2009.

Track listing 
"Electric Light" (Original Version) — 3:55
"Electric Light" (Gorm Jay Soft Club Mix) — 4:53
"Electric Light" (Hampenberg Club Mix) — 5:32
"Electric Light" (inf:klårb Mix) — 8:33
"Electric Light" (Twin Maniacs Remix) — 8:19

Charts

Year-end

Music video 
The music video was shot in Brooklyn, New York City and directed by Loïc Maes who also directed the previous videos from the Electric Cabaret album.

References

External links 
Electric Light at Discogs

2008 singles
Infernal (Danish band) songs
Songs written by Adam Powers
Songs written by Paw Lagermann
Songs written by Lina Rafn
2008 songs